The 1958–59 FIBA European Champions Cup' was the second season of the European top-tier level professional basketball club competition FIBA European Champions Cup (now called EuroLeague). It was won by Rīgas ASK for the second straight time, after they again beat Academic, in both EuroLeague Finals games (79–58 & 69–67). Riga defeated Lech Poznań in the semifinals, and Honvéd in the quarterfinals.

Competition system
21 teams. European national domestic league champions, plus the then current FIBA European Champions Cup title holders only, playing in a tournament system. The Finals were a two-game home and away aggregate.

First round

|}

*Etzella and Sundbyberg withdrew before the competition due to financial problems, so Lech Poznań and Honvéd received a forfeit (2–0) in both games

Second round

|}

*Simmenthal Milano withdrew after the 1st leg, team rejected playing on an outdoor court.

Automatically qualified to the quarter finals
 Rīgas ASK (title holder)

Quarterfinals 

|}

*The second leg was not played as Al-Gezira didn't travel to Bulgaria due to financial reasons, and therefore Academic received a forfeit (2-0).

Semifinals 

|}

Finals 

|}

Awards

FIBA European Champions Cup Finals Top Scorer
 Jānis Krūmiņš ( Rīgas ASK)

References

External links 
 1958–59 FIBA European Champions Cup 
 1958–59 FIBA European Champions Cup
 Champions Cup 1958–59 Line-ups and Stats

1958–59 in European basketball
EuroLeague seasons